The Craftivist Collective is "an inclusive group of people committed to using thoughtful, beautiful crafted works to help themselves and encourage others be the positive change they wish to see in the world." It was set up in 2009 by Sarah Corbett.
There are around 1000 members worldwide. The main group is based in London with around 10 further active groups.
The Craftivist Collective was a runner-up in the Observer Ethical Awards 2013 for the Arts & Culture Award. They were named by the Times as one of their five 'New Tribes' of 2012.
Followers of the movement include Lauren O'Farrell, Reverse graffiti artist Moose, Guardian craft columnist Perri Lewis, jewellers Tatty Devine, comedian Josie Long, Tilly Walnes, entrant in the first series of the Great British Sewing Bee, Company craft columnist and author Jazz Domino Holly, and mosaic artist Carrie Reichardt.
Sam Roddick is a mentor to the group and suggested the honorary label 'Craptivist' to cover non-crafty supporters.

There is a manifesto and a checklist of goals for the work of the group which includes being welcoming, encouraging and positive, creative and non-threatening, and to focus on global poverty and human rights injustices

About 

The Craftivist Collective has been called 'guerrilla crafting', as their projects often involve leaving crafted messages in public places. Their projects are often small-scale, intended to draw people in. There are lists of projects to do and video tutorials online.  They run talks, workshops, stalls and exhibitions and sell Craftivist Collective kits and merchandise.

The 'collective' is a loose term covering anyone who gets involved. The group particularly seeks to engage people who haven't previously had much involvement or interest in civic engagement. For many members the group is a stepping stone to more traditional activism methods. Corbett calls it 'slow activism' and 'introverted activism', saying "it's not about performance and vying for attention, it's about offering people the choice to engage".

The groups hold regular meetings. Other groups such as Women's Institutes and schools have also been involved in projects. The collective is self-funded and receives donated materials from supporters.

History 

A self-proclaimed 'burnt-out activist' who disliked the image of the aggressive activist, but wanted to do something to change the world, Sarah Corbett was involved in activism while growing up in Liverpool and then studying at the University of Manchester. She worked for traditional charities for seven years. It was after moving to London  for a job in 2007 and joining various activist groups that she started getting increasingly into her hobby of cross-stitch, finding that it helped with stress.

She didn't feel like she fitted into any of the activist groups she joined in London. She had been cross-stitching as a hobby since the age of 18 and in August 2008 had the 'light bulb' idea to combine the two.

Corbett set up the Lonely Craftivist blog in 2008 and began receiving comments and emails from people around the world asking to join in. She held a first meeting and got in touch with sociologist Betsy Greer who coined the word 'craftivism' in 2003 by. Greer was encouraging so Corbett founded and co-ordinated a national group called Craftivist Collective. In 2012 she went part-time at her Oxfam job to devote more time to the collective, and in October 2012 gave up her job to work full-time for Craftivist Collective.

Activities 

The group have worked with Christian Aid, One World Week, Oxfam, Save the Children, People & Planet, Toms Shoes, Bystander Revolution, UNICEF, and War on Want.

They have run workshops at the Greenbelt festival, Hayward Gallery, NUS Student Conference, Queen Elizabeth Hall, Secret Cinema, Secret Garden Party, Sheffield Doc/Fest, Southbank Centre, Tate Britain, UCL, Victoria and Albert Museum/Coats, Wilderness Festival and the Women's Library.

The group’s work has been exhibited at the Bluecoat gallery in Liverpool, the People's History Museum, St Fagans museum in Cardiff, and the Ulster Hall, Belfast.
The collective supports Fine Cell Work, a social enterprise that trains prisoners in needlework.

Talks 

Sarah Corbett has given talks about the Craftivist Collective at the British Museum, Sunday Wise, TedX Brixton, and the Wigtown Book Festival. She has been a guest lecturer at Parsons The New School for Design and Leeds College of Art.

Publications 

A Little Book of Craftivism by Sarah Corbett was published in Autumn 2013 by Cicada Publishing, distributed by Thames & Hudson. This was followed by How To Be A Craftivist in October 2017.

Media 

The collective was featured on Al Jazeera in September 2013 and on the Canal+ television show Nouveaux Explorateurs: Megalopolis, broadcast in France in November 2011.

References

External links 
 
 A Lonely Craftivist blog

Handicrafts
British artist groups and collectives
Political advocacy groups in the United Kingdom
2009 establishments in the United Kingdom